Abborrträsk Nature Reserve is a nature reserve in Stockholm County in Sweden.

The nature reserve protects the lake Abborrträsk and the surrounding area, which consists mainly of different types of forest.

References

External links

Nature reserves in Sweden
Geography of Stockholm County
Tourist attractions in Stockholm County